The 1995 Navarrese regional election was held on Sunday, 28 May 1995, to elect the 4th Parliament of the Chartered Community of Navarre. All 50 seats in the Parliament were up for election. The election was held simultaneously with regional elections in twelve other autonomous communities and local elections all throughout Spain.

Overview

Electoral system
The Parliament of Navarre was the devolved, unicameral legislature of the Chartered Community of Navarre, having legislative power in regional matters as defined by the Spanish Constitution and the Reintegration and Enhancement of the Foral Regime of Navarre Law, as well as the ability to vote confidence in or withdraw it from a regional president.

Voting was on the basis of universal suffrage, which comprised all nationals over 18 years of age, registered in Navarre and in full enjoyment of their political rights. The 50 members of the Parliament of Navarre were elected using the D'Hondt method and a closed list proportional representation, with a threshold of three percent of valid votes—which included blank ballots—being applied regionally. Parties not reaching the threshold were not taken into consideration for seat distribution.

The electoral law provided that parties, federations, coalitions and groupings of electors were allowed to present lists of candidates. However, groupings of electors were required to secure the signature of at least 1 percent of the electors registered in Navarre. Electors were barred from signing for more than one list of candidates. Concurrently, parties and federations intending to enter in coalition to take part jointly at an election were required to inform the relevant Electoral Commission within ten days of the election being called.

Election date
The term of the Parliament of Navarre expired four years after the date of its previous election, with elections to the Parliament being fixed for the fourth Sunday of May every four years. The previous election was held on 26 May 1991, setting the election date for the Parliament on Sunday, 28 May 1995.

The Parliament of Navarre could not be dissolved before the date of expiry of parliament. In the event of an investiture process failing to elect a regional president within a two-month period from the first ballot, the candidate from the party with the highest number of seats was to be deemed automatically elected.

Opinion polls
The table below lists voting intention estimates in reverse chronological order, showing the most recent first and using the dates when the survey fieldwork was done, as opposed to the date of publication. Where the fieldwork dates are unknown, the date of publication is given instead. The highest percentage figure in each polling survey is displayed with its background shaded in the leading party's colour. If a tie ensues, this is applied to the figures with the highest percentages. The "Lead" column on the right shows the percentage-point difference between the parties with the highest percentages in a poll. When available, seat projections determined by the polling organisations are displayed below (or in place of) the percentages in a smaller font; 26 seats were required for an absolute majority in the Parliament of Navarre.

Results

Aftermath

Government formation
Investiture processes to elect the President of the Government of Navarre required for an absolute majority—more than half the votes cast—to be obtained in the first ballot. If unsuccessful, a new ballot would be held 48 hours later under the same majority requirement, with successive votes requiring only of a simple majority—more affirmative than negative votes—to succeed. If such majorities were not achieved, successive candidate proposals would be processed under the same procedure. In the event of the investiture process failing to elect a regional President within a two-month period from the first ballot, the candidate from the party with the highest number of seats was deemed to be automatically elected.

1996 investiture
On 19 June 1996, Javier Otano resigned as President of Navarre after judicial investigations uncovered a Swiss bank account in his name and that of his wife, triggering a new investiture process in which Miguel Sanz from UPN was automatically elected on 18 September 1996, being the candidate from the party with the highest number of seats and with the investiture process having failed to elect a regional premier.

Notes

References
Opinion poll sources

Other

1995 in Navarre
Navarre
Regional elections in Navarre
May 1995 events in Europe